Hemanth Subramanya known by his stage name as Hemanth, is a playback singer in Kannada cinema.

Early life
Hemanth was born in a family of musicians at Bangalore, India. His mother Rathna Sastry is a classical singer and his father Subramanya Sastry is a retired economics professor. He considers his mother as his first Guru.

Hemanth practised Carnatic classical music under R. K. Srikantan and his son R. S. Ramakanth, Nagavalli Nagaraj and H. K. Narayana for about a decade.

Career
Hemanth started his film career as a music assistant to music director Hamsalekha, who also introduced him to the Kannada cinema. His foray into the film world was made in 2000 for the blockbuster movie Preethse. Hemanth replaced Udit Narayan in his debut song "Preetse Preetse" of movie Preethse composed by his mentor Hamsalekha.

Hemanth became a popular and prominent playback singer in Kannada cinema since his debut hit song "Preetse Preetse". Hemanth rendered his voice to many actors including Shiva Rajkumar, Puneeth Rajkumar, Upendra, Ganesh, Sudeep, Srinagar Kitty, Darshan, Yash to name a few. He has sung songs in composition of Hamsalekha, V. Manohar, Gurukiran, Mano Murthy, Arjun Janya, V. Sridhar, V. Harikrishna, Sadhu Kokila, Ricky Kej to name a few.

He has hosted and performed for TV musical shows in leading Kannada channels. “Kuhu Kuhu" for Udaya TV, “Gunagaana", "Sa Re Ga Ma Pa” and "Sa Re Ga Ma Pa little champs" for Zee Kannada TV to name a few. He has performed live worldwide, including at Muskat for the show “Gana Lahiri” organized by Kannada Sangha in 2008, at Dubai in 2012. Other live shows at Bahrain in 2013, at Nairobi during "Karunada Habba" Feb 2018.

Hemanth has also sung song in music albums "Life is Beautiful" and "Baa Sangaati" composed by Techies4Kannada and orchestral music from the Czech Republic. He is also featured in "Nee Badalaadare" music album composed by Ricky Kej which has patriotic songs in Kannada.

Discography
Partial list of songs sung by Hemanth.

Television

Awards

References

External links
 

Singers from Bangalore
Kannada playback singers
Indian male playback singers
Film musicians from Karnataka
Indian film score composers
Living people
Year of birth missing (living people)
Filmfare Awards South winners
Kannada people
21st-century Indian singers
21st-century Indian composers
Indian male film score composers
21st-century Indian male singers